is a former Japanese football player.

Playing career
Suganuma was born in Saitama on May 16, 1985. He joined J1 League club Kashiwa Reysol from youth team in 2002. He debuted in October and played several matches as forward every season. He was loaned to Brazilian club Vitória in 2005 and J2 League club Ehime FC in 2006. At Ehime, he became a regular player as offensive midfielder and scored 11 goals. In 2007, he returned to Reysol. He played as regular offensive midfielder. However Reysol was relegated to J2 end of 2009 season and his opportunity to play decreased in 2010. In July 2010, he moved to J1 club Júbilo Iwata. He played many matches as substitute midfielder and won the champions in 2010 J.League Cup. However he could hardly play in the match in 2013. In 2014, he moved to Sagan Tosu. However he could hardly play in the match and left the club end of 2015 season. After half year blank, he joined J2 club Roasso Kumamoto in August 2016. Although he played many matches in 2016, he could hardly play in the match in 2017 and retired end of 2017 season.

Club statistics

References

External links

Profile at Jubilo Iwata
Profile at Roasso Kumamoto

1985 births
Living people
Association football people from Saitama Prefecture
Japanese footballers
J1 League players
J2 League players
Kashiwa Reysol players
Esporte Clube Vitória players
Ehime FC players
Júbilo Iwata players
Sagan Tosu players
Roasso Kumamoto players
Expatriate footballers in Brazil
Association football midfielders